The Chief Of Air Staff (abbreviated as COAS) is the professional head and highest appointment of the Bangladesh Air Force. Only pilots (officers from GDP branch) get this post. The appointment is held by a four-star air officer and the current COAS is Air Chief Marshal Shaikh Abdul Hannan. Prior to 2016, from 2007 the appointment was held by an Air Marshal (three-star air officer) and from 1972 to 2007 COAS's rank was Air Vice Marshal.

List of Chiefs of Air Staff

See also
List of serving air marshals of the Bangladesh Air Force

References

Bangladesh
Bangladesh Air Force
Chiefs of Air Staff (Bangladesh)